Nesomia is a genus of flowering plants in the tribe Eupatorieae within the family Asteraceae.

The genus is named in honor of American botanist Guy L. Nesom.

Species
The only known species is Nesomia chiapensis, native to the State of Chiapas in southern Mexico.

References

Flora of Chiapas
Eupatorieae
Monotypic Asteraceae genera